Sue Peabody is a historian and Meyer Distinguished Professor of history at Washington State University Vancouver. She is the author of "There Are No Slaves in France": The Political Culture of Race and Slavery in the Ancien Regime (Oxford, 1996). She is the co-editor, with Tyler Stovall, of The Color of Liberty: Histories of Race in France (Duke University Press, 2003) and, with Keila Grinberg, Slavery, Freedom and the Law in the Atlantic World (Bedford, 2007).

Awards and honors
Her book, Madeleine's Children: Family, Freedom, Secrets, and Lies in France's Indian Ocean Colonies (Oxford University Press, 2017) won three prizes: 2018 Society for French Historical Studies' David H. Pinkney Prize for "the most distinguished book in French history, published for the first time the preceding year by a citizen of the United States or Canada"; 2018 French Colonial Historical Society's Mary Alice and Philip Boucher Prize for "the best book dealing with the French colonial experience from the 16th century to 1815"; and the 2018 Western Association of Women Historians' Frances Richardson Keller-Sierra Prize for "the best monograph in the field of history published by a WAWH member."

References

External links
 Sue Peabody at Washington State University

1960 births
Living people
21st-century American historians
Washington State University faculty
American women historians
21st-century American women writers